In 1989, I.M.P.S and R-Tek Music, International released Smurfin! Tenth Anniversary Commemorative Album, a collection of 1960s and 1980s pop songs covered by the Smurfs. Created by Peyo, The Smurfs were a hit in North America, releasing several albums including a Christmas album.

Smurfin! was recorded at the S.B. Studios in Huizen, the Netherlands. It was produced by Cees Jansen and Sander Bos, and was arranged by Cor Willems. It was released on CD, cassette and 2-record LP by Quality Special Products in Canada and the US, and Dino Music in Australia. It was also released in New Zealand and some parts of Europe.

Although there were 20 tracks recorded, not all tracks were used on each "Edition" of the album. Some of the Smurfin! CDs used between 10 and 20 of the 20 tracks recorded: The Australian CD, cassette and LP versions all contained the same 16 tracks, while the US CD release contained all 20 tracks.

The Canadian and American cassettes were released in two versions: one version contained 16 tracks, while the other was split into two albums, each with 10 songs. One Album was blue, with the main cover photo, and the other was white, also with the main cover photo. The Australian cassette was not split into two albums, but it did use different artwork than the Canadian/American release. It used the back cover image with track titles overlaid and the banner from the normal front cover. Australian and Canadian releases of the CD and cassette were identical.

The US LP consisted of all 20 tracks over 2 discs, while the Australian and Canadian pressings contained the same 16 tracks from the CD and Cassette editions, and was only 1 vinyl disc.

The four tracks usually left off the CD/cassette were: The Lion Sleeps Tonight, Simon Says, I Should Be So Lucky and Especially for You were not on the Australian CD release or Canadian cassette release. They were both on the US LP release, and I Should be so Lucky was on the American cassette while Especially for You was on the American CD.

Kylie Minogue has the most songs covered with three: The Locomotion, I Should Be So Lucky and Especially for You.  The Beach Boys have two songs covered: Surfin' U.S.A. and Kokomo. All the rest of the original artists have only one song covered.

Track listing (For CD and cassette)

(N/A:)These tracks did not appear on this version of the album.

Track listing for US LP

The record album had two LPs and four sides.  Each side contained five songs, in a different order than the CD/cassettes.

Record One/Side One 

 I Think We're Alone Now
 The Locomotion
 I Should Be So Lucky
 Whenever You Need Somebody
 Simply Irresistible

Record One/Side Two 

 Get Outta My Dreams, Get Into My Car
 You Keep Me Hanging On
 Walking On Sunshine
 Twist and Shout
 Simon Says

Record Two/Side One 

 Nothing's Gonna Change my Love For You
 Especially for You
 Gargamel and the Smurfs
 Smurfin' USA
 La Bamba

Record Two/Side Two 

 The Lion Sleeps Tonight
 Don't Worry Be Happy
 Walk Like an Egyptian
 Kokomo
 Smurf Town

External links

The Smurfs official site
A commercial for the album on youtube.
Happy Smurfday: Official Smurfs 50th Anniversary site

The Smurfs music
Novelty albums
1989 albums